Choi Ki-sang (born 7 October 1969) is a South Korean politician and former judge serving as a member of the National Assembly for Geumcheon since 30 May 2020. He is a member of the Democratic Party of Korea. He currently serves as head of the Ethics Inspection Group of the Democratic Party of Korea, and deputy floor leader of law within the party. Prior to politics, Choi was the chief judge of the Seoul Central District Court.

Early life and education
Choi was born on 7 October 1969 in Yeongam. He graduated from Salesian High School in Gwangju, before graduating from the Department of Business Administration at Seoul National University in 1994.

Career
Choi completed law training in 1996, and became a judge at the Gwangju District Court in 1999. He switched between various courts around Korea over the next decade, before becoming the chief judge at the Seoul Central District Court in 2015. He switched to chief judge at the Seoul Northern District Court in 2018.

Political career
Choi ran for the Democratic Party of Korea in Seoul Geumcheon in the 2020 South Korean legislative election, winning the election with 64,735 votes, and a majority of 49.63%. Until May 2021 he served as deputy chairman of the policy committee within the party, and from May 2021 until October 2022 he served as standing vice chairman of the policy committee. He currently serves as head of the Ethics Inspection Team, and as deputy floor leader of the Democratic Party (law).

He is also currently a member of the Special Committee on Budget and Accounts, and member of the Legislation and Judiciary Committee.

In early 2021, Choi took part in the Gyeonggi-do Basic Housing Debate held by the Gyeonggi Housing and Communities Corporation.

In late 2022, Choi announced a bill to support the relocation of a military base in the centre of the constituency. Later, Choi also announced an initiative to amend the Public Official Election Act, to alleviate excessive restrictions on people's freedom of political expression.

Electoral history

References

External links
 National Assembly Profile (in Korean)

1969 births
Seoul National University alumni
Living people
Members of the National Assembly (South Korea)
Minjoo Party of Korea politicians